Ivar Johansson may refer to:

 Ivar Johansson (director) (1889–1963), Swedish film director
Ivar Johansson (politician) (1899–unknown), Swedish politician
Ivar Johansson (wrestler) (1903–1979), Swedish wrestler